Joseph Emanuel Roth (born 13 June 1948) is an American film executive, producer and director. He co-founded Morgan Creek Productions in 1988 and was chairman of 20th Century Fox (1989–1993), Caravan Pictures (1993–1994), and Walt Disney Studios (1994–2000) before founding Revolution Studios in 2000, then Roth Films.

Early life
Roth was born on 13 June 1948 to Frances and Lawrence Roth. He has stated that his Jewish family faced various forms of harassment growing up in a heavily Catholic part of Long Island, New York. This involved incidents like "a cross being burned on the lawn and some of Roth's schoolmates crossed themselves before they would speak to him." In 1959, Roth's father volunteered his son to be a plaintiff in the ACLU's effort to abolish mandatory prayer in public schools. The case, filed in New York, went through several appeals, finally reaching the U.S. Supreme Court in 1962. The Court ruled that such prayer was unconstitutional under the First Amendment, in the landmark case of Engel v. Vitale.

Roth attended Boston University, graduating in 1970 with a bachelor's degree in communication.

Career
Over the course of his career, he has produced over 40 films, and has directed six to date, including 1990's Coupe de Ville, 2001's America's Sweethearts and 2006's Freedomland.

In 1988 by Roth and James Robinson co-founded Morgan Creek Entertainment. The name came from Roth's favorite film, The Miracle of Morgan's Creek. The company had box-office hits including Young Guns and Major League.

In 1992, he co-founded Caravan Pictures with Roger Birnbaum, which had a production deal with The Walt Disney Studios. Roth moved on to be Disney studio chief on August 24, 1994. Disney CEO Michael Eisner was so set on replacing Jeffrey Katzenberg as Disney studio chief with Roth that he forgave the $15 million cost overrun debt for I Love Trouble and paid Roth $40 million of fees for 21 unproduced films under the deal.

Roth, who was ranked 6th in Premiere Magazines 2003 Hollywood Power List, produced the 76th annual Academy Awards. Roth announced in October 2007 that, when Revolution's distribution deal with Sony Pictures ended, That he would depart from Revolution Studios to form his own production company, Roth Films.

On November 13, 2007, Roth was introduced as the majority owner of a Seattle, Washington–based Major League Soccer franchise along with Paul Allen. Seattle Sounders FC—which calls Lumen Field home—began regular season play in 2009. On November 12, 2015, Roth passed on majority ownership to Adrian Hanauer.

Personal life
Roth was married to Donna Arkoff whose father was movie producer Samuel Z. Arkoff. They have three children. 

The family resided in the Dolores del Río House, designed by architect Douglas Honnold for Irish production designer Cedric Gibbons and Mexican actress Dolores del Río in 1929 in Pacific Palisades, Los Angeles, California.

Filmography

Film

Miscellaneous crew

As an actor

Production manager

Thanks

Television
Producer

Executive producer

Production manager

Thanks

References

External links

American soccer chairmen and investors
American film studio executives
Living people
Major League Soccer executives
Businesspeople from New York City
American film producers
Disney people
Boston University College of Communication alumni
Film directors from Los Angeles
Year of birth missing (living people)
Jewish film people
American people of Jewish descent
People from Long Island